Country Code: +676
International Call Prefix: 00

yy xxx      Calls inside Tonga

+676 yy xxx  Calls from outside Tonga

List of area codes in Tonga

Additionally, mobile phones provided by U-Call Mobile are prefixed by the two-digit code of either 15, 16, 17, 18 or 19.

See also 

 Telecommunications in Tonga

References 

Tonga
Communications in Tonga